Peter Joseph Dranginis (November 13, 1909 – August 5, 1995) was an American football player and coach. He played college football at the Catholic University of America and professionally in the American Football League with the Boston Shamrocks and the Pittsburgh Americans. Dranginis served as the co-head football coach at Middlebury College in 1944 with C. W. Laird. Together they compiled a record of 2–1. Dranginis also played college basketball at Catholic University.

Head coaching record

References

External links
 

1909 births
1995 deaths
American football quarterbacks
American men's basketball players
Boston Shamrocks (AFL) players
Catholic University Cardinals football players
Catholic University Cardinals men's basketball players
Middlebury Panthers football coaches
Pittsburgh Americans players